Chintadri Pillaiyar Kovil is a Hindu temple in Devaraja Mudali Street in Georgetown, Chennai. The temple is dedicated to Ganesa and was constructed in 1717. The temples is situated close to the Mallikesvarar Temple and was the site of a dispute between the Komati Chetti and Beri Chetti communities in the 18th century.

References 

 

Hindu temples in Chennai